Anna Seebacher (born 9 March 1994) is an Austrian cross-country skier. She competed in the women's 10 kilometre freestyle at the 2018 Winter Olympics.

Cross-country skiing results
All results are sourced from the International Ski Federation (FIS).

Olympic Games

World Championships

World Cup

Season standings

References

1994 births
Living people
Austrian female cross-country skiers
Olympic cross-country skiers of Austria
Cross-country skiers at the 2018 Winter Olympics
Place of birth missing (living people)
21st-century Austrian women